Plurien (Gallo: Pluriaen) is a commune in the Côtes-d'Armor department of Brittany in northwestern France.

Population
Inhabitants of Plurien are called pluriennais in French.

See also
 Communes of the Côtes-d'Armor department

References

External links

 Tourism Office 
 Official website 

Communes of Côtes-d'Armor